Beli is a village in Croatia.

References

Populated places in Primorje-Gorski Kotar County
Cres